Maria Burmaka (born June 16, 1970 in Kharkiv, Ukraine) is a Ukrainian singer, TV personality, musician, and songwriter in the genres of rock, pop, folk, and world music. She also holds the title of People's Artist of Ukraine.

Biography and education 
Burmaka was born into a family of teachers. She began singing Ukrainian songs while studying in guitar class in a musical school. She graduated from that school, specializing in guitar. In 1987, she entered the faculty of philology of Kharkiv University of Karazin. As a student, she began to write original songs. 

In 2004, Burmaka graduated from the Taras Shevchenko National University of Kyiv with a degree in journalism. She also has a PhD degree in philology.

Early festivals and contests

Early in her career, Burmaka won several important and All-Ukrainian musical contests or festivals, which quickly made her famous and made her an icon of the Ukrainian music.

In 1989, Burmaka won first place in Lutsk at the Oberig music festival and came second at the famous Chervony Ruta youth music festival in Chernivtsi. In June 1990, she won in Kaniv the All-Ukrainian Festival DZVIN, earning the title of "Laureate". In 1993, she won the hit-song contest "12-2" organized by the radio platform Promin.

Music career

Burmaka has been an active participant in many events in modern Ukrainian history, including the aforementioned first Chervona Ruta festival (1989), Student Hunger on Granite (1990), "Orange Revolution" (2004) and Revolution of Dignity (2013–2014).

In 1991, she recorded her first CD, Maria, which was produced in Montreal by the Canadian company Yevshan. This became the first Ukrainian-language musical CD to be launched in Ukraine.

In 1998, Burmaka released another album, Znovu lyublyu ("In Love Again"). The presentation of the record was special: Burmaka invited her closest friends and the press to the 17-18th century icons hall in the National Fine Arts Museum, where she gave an acoustic guitar concert.

Language
Burmaka is a staunch supporter of the Ukrainian language and is the only People's Artist of Ukraine who does not perform in the Russian language, nor has a musical repertoire in Russian language. She stated, "Ukrainian regions without Ukrainian language lose their ethnic identity and freedom."

Performances

In 2005, Burmaka recorded several English versions of her songs, produced new musical clips, and gave several charity concerts in North America. She performed at the largest Ukrainian festival in the United States, Verkhovyna, and at the Lemkivska Vatra festival in Poland. In 2011, she gave a joint performance at the festival Soyuzivka.

In the summer and autumn of 2014, as part of the tour "Support Ours", she gave performances in the ATO zone, in front-line cities. The funds collected from these performances were spent on the needs of the volunteer battalion.

In the winter of 2015, the singer performed at charity concerts in the United Kingdom. That spring, she also performed at charity concerts in the US, and in Canada that November.

TV career

In the 1990s, Burmaka served as a TV host on the STB channel of shows including Kin, Rating, Who is there, and Teapot; and on the UT-1 channel of the show Create Yourself.

In May 2011, Burmaka was the lead author of the show Music for Breakfast on the 1+1 channel. As of September 2011, she was the lead author of the show Music for adults with Maria Burmaka on the TVi channel. Currently, she is the lead author and host of the show on the Expresso channel, Cult-Express.

Awards and recognition

 1997: received the title of Honored Artist of Ukraine
 2007: awarded the Order of Princess Olga (III degree)
 2009: awarded the honorary title "People's Artist of Ukraine"
 Named on Focus magazine's list of the top 100 most influential women in Ukraine

Albums 
1990 Ой не квiтни, весно (Oy ne kvitny, vesno; Oh Spring, Do Not Bloom...)
1992 Марiя (Mariya; Maria)
1994 Лишається надiя (Lyshayet'sia nadiya; Hope is left)
1998 Знову люблю (Znovu liubliu; I love again)
2001 Iз янголом на плечi (Iz yanholom na plechi; With the angel on my shoulder)
2002 Мiа (Mia)
2003 I Am
2003 Живи (Zhyvy; Live)
2004 N9
2008 Саундтреки (Soundtracks)
2010 Do not laugh at me (Не смійся з мене), joint album with Peter Yarrow
2011 Album for Children (Дитячий Альбом)
2014 Тінь по воді (Tin' na vodi; Shadow on the Water)

References

External links

References 

1970 births
Living people
20th-century Ukrainian women singers
21st-century Ukrainian women singers
Musicians from Kharkiv
National University of Kharkiv alumni
People of the Revolution on Granite
Recipients of the Vasyl Stus Prize
Recipients of the title of Merited Artist of Ukraine
Recipients of the title of People's Artists of Ukraine
Recipients of the Order of Princess Olga, 3rd class
Ukrainian pop singers
Ukrainian rock singers